Henri de Saint-Ignace (b. in 1630, at Ath in Hainaut, Belgium; d. in 1719 or 1720, near Liège) was a Belgian Carmelite theologian.

Life
As a professor of moral theology he was noted for his learning, but still more for his Jansenistic tendencies. He took part in all the controversies of his time on grace and free will.

While professing himself a follower of Augustine of Hippo and Thomas Aquinas, he favoured the views of Baius and Jansenius. His long sojourn in Rome during the pontificate of Pope Clement XI helped keep him orthodox, but did not diminish his antipathy towards the Jesuits, whom he opposed vigorously all his life.

Works
He published "Theologia vetus fundamentalis", according to the mind of "the resolute doctor", J. Bacon (Liège, 1677); "Theologia sanctorum veterum et novissimorum", a defence of morality against the attacks of the modern casuists (Louvain, 1700).

His chief work is entitled "Ethica amoris, or the theology of the saints (especially of St. Augustine and St. Thomas) on the doctrine of love and morality strenuously defended against the new opinions and thoroughly discussed in connection with the principal controversies of our time" (3 vols., Liège, 1709). The first volume treats of human acts; the second of laws and virtues, and the decalogue; the third, of the sacraments.

In the last volume the author makes frequent use of the "Tempestas novaturiensis" written by his fellow-religious, Alexandre de Sainte-Therese (1686), and adopts all the novel opinions then in vogue with regard to the administration of the Eucharist. Theologians criticized this work, and it was forbidden at Rome by the decrees of 12 September 1714, and 29 July 1722. The Parlement of Paris also condemned it.

Instead of explaining the teaching of the Church, the author fills his book with all the disputes about the relaxation of public morality that were then disturbing men's minds. While not explicitly approving of the errors of Jansenism, he favors them. He even praises the "Reflexions morales" of Quesnel, which at that point had not yet been condemned. He incurred the censure of the theologians of his own order (Memoires de Trévoux, 1715, a. 100).

In 1713, before the appearance of the Bull Unigenitus, he published "Gratiae per se efficacis seu augustiniano-thomisticae defensio", which is a defence of Jansenism. This provoked a vigorous reply from P. Meyer, S.J. (Brussels, 1715). Finally, we may mention his "Molinismus profligatus" (Cologne, 1717), in which he defends himself against the Fathers of the same society, notably "Artes jesuiticae in sustinendis pertinaciter novitatibus laxitatibusque sociorum" (4th ed., Strasburg, 1717), where doctrinal controversy is replaced by disquisitions against his opponents and their order.

References
Memoires de Trévoux, 1713 and 1715;
Feller, Biographie Universelle;
Hugo von Hurter, Nomenclator.

External links
Catholic Encyclopedia article

1630 births
18th-century deaths
People from Ath
Carmelites
Roman Catholic theologians of the Spanish Netherlands